88.9 FM (call sign 2YOU) is a community radio station broadcasting from Tamworth, Australia and is available online via iHeartRadio.

88.9 FM was the first FM station in Tamworth and has been broadcasting since 1983 across parts of the New England and Northwest. 88.9 FM is a member of the Community Broadcasting Association of Australia (CBAA) and aims to be a local voice for the Tamworth, New England/Northwest/Liverpool Plains area, offering regional news, outside broadcasts, local information, community announcements, coverage of major events and broadcasting essential emergency information.

The station's main frequency is 88.9 MHz on the FM band, with a repeater 96.3 MHz in the Liverpool Plains area covering Quirindi and Werris Creek.

2YOU FM beginnings
2YOU FM started in tiny studios out the back of the old computer fiscal building in Marius street Tamworth, although the studio, administration and library were actually in the rear off Dowe Ave in the old laundry rooms. The studio were lined with egg cartons for insulation it had two B&W turntables, a cassette player, a six slider panel and a microphone. From such humble beginnings 2YOU FM had moved twice more, to 324A Peel street in 1984 and to current studios the National Trust Railway Building in Darling Street East Tamworth.

Change to 88.9 FM
In May 2014, the call sign 2YOU was dropped and the stations name was changed to its frequency 88.9 FM, which allowed listeners to remember the station. With the new image, included new presenters, a contracted national voice-over production company and to complement a strong music format. 
The previous format was changed from numerous music genres and "ad hoc programs" that had poor listening audience into a format of '70s, '80s, '90s and the best in country. Regular shifts across the board were implemented, new image jingles, regional news from 88.9 FM Newsroom plus Macquarie National News cross promotion with Prime 7 Television.  

The station broadcasts from its own building and tower from Bald Hill at 956-meter's 5 kilometres east of Tamworth in its broadcast coverage, including Tamworth City, Tamworth Regional, [, New South Wales, Manilla, Quirindi and various towns in New England and The Northwest of New South Wales.

In September 2019 after further research the station introduced a new theme "We've Got the Music" with new jingles to build on their 45 to 65 year old market. The station imaging is also on Regional/City Buses and posters in local shopping centres to promote the new image of the station.

In June 2020, Tamworth Broadcasting Society serving the Liverpool Plains area as part of their licence on 96.3FM, therefore with 88.9FM the station now covers the  New England/ Northwest and Liverpool Plains of New South Wales. In 2021 the station commenced both Streaming and iHeart Nationally and Internationally.

Programming
There is a mixed listening format all day with songs from the '60s, '70s, '80s, ‘90s and the best in country. 88.9 FM operates Locally from Tamworth 24/7. Including, Breakfast, Morning, Afternoon, Drive, Nights and Weekends.Overnight 7 Days  12midnight 5:00am hit formatSegments on 88.9FM include:
Howdy's Dateline (birthday’s and chart’s on this day)
Cactus
Fresh Produce Market Update with Brendon North
Tech Talk with Adam Petronaitis
Entertainment Emma Bailey
Sport Mike Rabbitt.
Weather NBN"s Gavin Morris
4 Regional Breakfast News Bulletins
Cash Prizes Daily "Guess the Gob"

88.9 FM has its own news team providing six daily Regional and Local News Bulletins.

Hourly news bulletins by 9News (formally Macquarie National News).

Notable presenters

Former Presenters  
Ryan Sampson
Pixie Jenkins
Debbie G
Jodie Crosby

Income
The station earns income mainly from sponsors, outside broadcasts and membership. Sponsorship takes the form of payment for on-air promotions of local business from a set Rate Card. 88.9 FM sales offers broadcast and social media packages.

88.9 FM has a full-time staff of 15, including administration, production, engineering, sales/marketing team, five permanent casuals, and five volunteers.

Technical data 
 Frequency – 88.9 FM Tamworth
 Broadcasts Site – Bald Hill, 938 Metres high, 5 kilometres East of Tamworth City
 Multiplexed  ZPG high gain antenna array 
 Transmitter 1 – 2016 BWFM transmitter
 Transmitter 2 – 2015 BWFM transmitter
 Full emergency backup power
FM RDS

Liverpool Plains Repeater
 Frequency – 96.3 FM Quirindi 
 Broadcast Site - Who‘d-A-Thought-It Lookout, 508 Metres high, 5 kilometres West of Quirindi
 Transmitter 1 - 2020 BWFM transmitter

Studios
 Automation System – Studio's A,C,D Newsroom all interfaced through automation;"Maximation 7"
 Production studios: Adobe
 Desk: Elan 'Kestral 12' Studio in A, Studio B custom Auditron news/producers desk, Studio C and D - Elan "Merlin" both set up with full digital editing facilities.

References

External links 
 88.9FM Official website
 CBAA website

Community radio stations in Australia
Radio stations in New South Wales
Tamworth, New South Wales
Radio stations established in 1982
1982 establishments in Australia